Silvia Isabel Monge Villalobos (born 20 November 1967) is a Mexican politician from the National Action Party. From 2009 to 2012 she served as Deputy of the LXI Legislature of the Mexican Congress representing Veracruz.

References

1967 births
Living people
Politicians from Veracruz
Women members of the Chamber of Deputies (Mexico)
National Action Party (Mexico) politicians
21st-century Mexican politicians
21st-century Mexican women politicians
People from Coatepec, Veracruz
Members of the Congress of Veracruz
Deputies of the LXI Legislature of Mexico
Members of the Chamber of Deputies (Mexico) for Veracruz